Anne Kristine Thorsby (born 13 May 1962 in Oslo) is a Norwegian visual artist, living in Lillehammer.

Life
Thorsby was born in 1960 in Oslo.

She graduated from the Art Academy in Oslo in 1989. She debuted in 1988 with the participation of Østlandsutstillingen and a solo exhibition at the Lillehammer Art Association of 1991. She has had over 30 solo exhibitions and commissions at several galleries. She lives in Lillehammer.

References

External links
 

Living people
1962 births
20th-century Norwegian women artists
21st-century Norwegian women artists
Artists from Oslo